Let's Eat is a 2013 South Korean television series starring Lee Soo-kyung, Yoon Doo-joon, Shim Hyung-tak and Yoon So-hee. It aired on tvN from November 28, 2013 to March 13, 2014 for 16 episodes. The series is about four single people who are brought together by their love of food.

Synopsis
Four single people: happily divorced paralegal Lee Soo-kyung (Lee Soo-kyung), mysterious gourmand Goo Dae-young (Yoon Doo-joon), design student and former rich girl Yoon Jin-yi (Yoon So-hee), and petty lawyer Kim Hak-moon (Shim Hyung-tak). Who enjoy living alone, except for that pesky problem that dining out is not designed for one. At Jin-yi's request, she, Soo-kyung and Dae-young start eating out together and thus get involved in each other's lives.
Let's Eat depicts the daily life and romance of a single woman when a murder case occurs in her neighborhood. Lee Soo-Kyung  is a 33-year-old single woman. She divorced when she was in her 20's and now lives alone. She always wants to carry herself with dignity, but she loses self-control when she is near gourmet foods. Koo Dae-Young is a gourmet, especially talented with describing the taste of foods. He often lies when he opens his mouth, but he is usually considerate of others.

Cast

Main
 Lee Soo-kyung as Lee Soo-kyung
A chief secretary at a lawyer's office who craves food and often attempts to always follow the law. She's arrogant, rude, sassy, and tends to be a know-it-all, but she has a kinder side. She begins to show feeling for Dae-young.
 Yoon Doo-joon as Goo Dae-young
The mysterious neighbor who seems to always catch the hearts of the young ladies. He seems to be an expert on food, and likes to show it also.
 Shim Hyung-tak as Kim Hak-moon
Soo-kyungs's boss who acts rude, arrogant, and mean, but he actually has an obsessive crush on Soo-kyung.
 Yoon So-hee as Yoon Jin-yi
The new quirky young lady whose parents lives the States, and she quickly made friends with Dae-young.

Recurring
 Lee Do-yeon as Oh Do-yeon
 Jang Won-young as Choi Kyu-sik
 Jung Soo-young as Park Kyung-mi
 Hong Eun-taek as Choi Deok-young
 Feeldog as Hyun Kwang-suk
 Choi Dae-sung as Laundromat boss
 Jung Tae-sung as Hak-moon's nephew

Special appearances
 Park Young-seo as man on Soo-kyung's blind date (ep. 1)
 Lee Yong-nyeo as Bae Mi-ja (ep. 1)
 Lee Sang-woo as Kim Sung-soo, divorce client (ep. 8)
 Nam Nung-mi as Soo-kyung's mother (ep. 8-9)
 Kang Ye-bin as woman on Hak-moon's blind date (ep. 9)
 Heo Gu-yeon as Dae-young's father (ep. 10)
 Choi Phillip as Catholic church oppa, Soo-kyung's third ex-boyfriend (ep. 11)
 Lee Yong-joo as basketball team captain, Soo-kyung's second ex-boyfriend (ep. 11)
 Lee Yoon-mi as pet shop owner (ep. 11)
 Nam Chang-hee as dog owner (ep. 12)
 Sam Hammington as president of soy sauce crab restaurant (ep. 12)
 Kim San-ho as Hak-moon's restaurant owner friend (ep. 13)
 Choi Sung-joon as assailant (ep. 14)
 Jung Eun-pyo as police officer (ep. 14)
 Jung Kyung-ho as housing agency employee (ep. 15)
 Lee Il-hwa as Kwang-suk's mother (ep. 16)
 Uhm Hyun-kyung as restaurant customer eating delicious food (ep. 16)
 Kim Hyun-sook as Lee Young-ae, cafe customer (ep. 16)
 Ra Mi-ran as Manager Ra, cafe customer (ep. 16)
 An unknown Siberian Husky that scared Mr. Kim (ep. 12)

Production
The drama features eating scenes of the characters who live alone. Park Joon-hwa, producer-director of the drama, said "The drama focuses on building relationships between strangers through having a meal and ultimately relieving their solitude. It portrays the process of how people improve relations via food", and further explained that "Korean dramas have lots of eating scenes in which conflict erupts or settles down".

Ratings
 In this table,  represent the lowest ratings and  represent the highest ratings.
 N/A denotes that the rating is not known.

Sequel
A second season titled Let's Eat 2 aired in 2015, but only Yoon Doo-joon reprised his role as Goo Dae-young, who moves to Sejong City and befriends new neighbors played by Seo Hyun-jin and Kwon Yul.

The third season Let's Eat 3 aired in 2018 with Goo Dae-young, in his 30s, revisiting foods he loved in his 20s with former college classmate Lee Ji-woo (Baek Jin-hee) & their memories of the past.

References

External links
 Let's Eat official tvN website 
 
 

2013 South Korean television series debuts
TVN (South Korean TV channel) television dramas
Korean-language television shows
2014 South Korean television series endings
Television series by CJ E&M
South Korean cooking television series
South Korean romance television series
South Korean comedy television series